Anthony John Perrett is an Australian politician. He has been the Liberal National Party member for Gympie in the Queensland Legislative Assembly since 2015.

Biography

Tony Perrett is the son of former Borbidge Ministry Primary Industries Minister Trevor Perrett.

He has previously served as the Deputy Mayor of the Gympie Region Council and as a Councillor on the Kilkivan Shire Council, and as former state president, federal secretary and vice-president of the Young Nationals.

References

Year of birth missing (living people)
Living people
Members of the Queensland Legislative Assembly
Liberal National Party of Queensland politicians
21st-century Australian politicians